Garden house may refer to:
 a summer house or small building in a garden
 a house built under the provision of special legislation (usu. in Scandinavia), for instance a Friggebod
The Garden House, an open garden near Buckland Monachorum, Devon, UK